Thomas Barton Kyle (March 10, 1856 – August 13, 1915) was a lawyer, politician, and two-term U.S. Representative from Ohio from 1901 to 1905.

Biography 
Born in Troy, Ohio, Kyle attended the public schools and Dartmouth College in Hanover, New Hampshire.
He subsequently studied law, and was admitted to the bar in 1884. He then commenced his practice in Troy. Kyle was elected as the prosecuting attorney of Miami County in 1890. He served as president of the board of education of Troy and later was the town's mayor.

Congress 
Kyle was elected as a Republican to the Fifty-seventh and Fifty-eighth Congresses (March 4, 1901 – March 3, 1905). He was an unsuccessful candidate for renomination in 1904.

Later career and death 
He resumed the practice of his profession in Troy, where he died on August 13, 1915. He was interred in Riverside Cemetery.

References
 

1856 births
1915 deaths
Dartmouth College alumni
People from Troy, Ohio
County district attorneys in Ohio
Ohio lawyers
19th-century American politicians
19th-century American lawyers
Republican Party members of the United States House of Representatives from Ohio